Uab Meto or Dawan is an Austronesian language spoken by Atoni people of West Timor. The language has a variant spoken in the East Timorese exclave of Oecussi-Ambeno, called Baikenu. Baikenu uses words derived from Portuguese, for example,  for 'thank you', instead of the Indonesian .

Phonology 
Dawan has the following consonants and vowels:

Voiceless plosives  can have unreleased allophones  in word-final position. A phonemic  can be heard in place of  among dialects.

Vocabulary 
A wordlist of 200 basic vocabulary items is available at the Austronesian Basic Vocabulary Database, with data provided by Robert Blust and from Edwards (2016).

Numbers

See also

Languages of Indonesia
Languages of East Timor

References

Further reading

External links

Uab Meto Site
Uab Meto Resources
Indonesian – English – Uab Meto Dictionary

Languages of Indonesia
Languages of East Timor
Timor–Babar languages